Mahizan may refer to:
 Mahizan-e Olya
 Mahizan-e Sofla